Blondin was a French tightrope walker.

Blondin may also refer to:
Blondin (surname), a surname (and list of people with the name)
Blondin (quarry equipment)

See also 

Blondel (disambiguation)